Michele Maffei (born 11 November 1946) is a retired Italian fencer. He won a gold and three silver medals in the team sabre events at four Olympic Games.

References

1946 births
Living people
Italian male fencers
Olympic fencers of Italy
Fencers at the 1968 Summer Olympics
Fencers at the 1972 Summer Olympics
Fencers at the 1976 Summer Olympics
Fencers at the 1980 Summer Olympics
Olympic gold medalists for Italy
Olympic silver medalists for Italy
Olympic medalists in fencing
Fencers from Rome
Medalists at the 1968 Summer Olympics
Medalists at the 1972 Summer Olympics
Medalists at the 1976 Summer Olympics
Medalists at the 1980 Summer Olympics
Universiade medalists in fencing
Universiade silver medalists for Italy
Medalists at the 1970 Summer Universiade